The Secondary School Leaving Certificate (commonly referred to as SSLC) is a certification obtained by a student on successful completion of an examination at the end of study at the secondary schooling level in India. The SSLC is obtained on passing the grade 10 public examination, which is commonly referred to as 'class 10 board examinations' in India. SSLC is a common eligibility examination popular in many states in India, especially Kerala, Karnataka, and Tamil Nadu. The SSLC is also called as Secondary School Certificate (SSC) in Andhra Pradesh, Telangana and also as Matriculation in many states of India.

Relevance 

The Indian system of education fundamentally consists of five years of primary schooling, followed by five years of secondary schooling. The SSLC must be obtained at the end of term of study at the secondary school.

On obtaining this certificate, the student is deemed to have completed secondary schooling. After successful completion of SSLC, Students will further pursue their higher secondary education i.e Class 11th and Class 12th by either attending a Junior College or by continuing High School in one of three streams – Science, Commerce or Arts. After this students will pursue their undergraduate studies in desired universities of their choice.  

Alternatively, after obtaining the SSLC, a student may choose to attend an industrial training institute where one can be trained in skills necessary for technical occupations. The other options include joining polytechnic for a three-year course of diploma in engineering and then further pursuing degree in engineering. After completing SSLC there is an option of joining vocational education courses. SSLC (or equivalent) is required nowadays to obtain a passport under Indian government for employment purposes.

Importance 
The SSLC certificate was used as the primary form of proof for date of birth during the time when registration of births and deaths was not mandatory in India. It is still a valid form of proof of date of birth for those born before 1989 according to the MEA website for the Indian civil authorities to issue civil documents such as passports. It is also a proof of eligibility for higher studies. If caste is denoted in the SSLC certificate it can also be used as a substitute of the caste certificate issued by Village Officer/Tahasildar in some states of India

Grading 
In Kerala Students require a minimum 10th passing mark of 30% in each subject to qualify Kerala board SSLC exams. The total duration of Kerala SSLC exam 2022 is 2 hr 45 mins for 100 marks exam and 1 hr 45 mins for 50 marks subject.

To be eligible for higher education and get passing grades in Kerala SSLC exam result 2022, student must receive at least a D+ (30-39 percent) in each paper. Kerala SSLC Passing Marks for compartmental exams are also same as annual exams.

See also 

 Central Board of Secondary Education (CBSE), India
 National Institute of Open Schooling (NIOS), India
 Council for the Indian School Certificate Examinations (CISCE), India
 Kerala Board of Public Examination

References

External links
Office of the Commissioner of Government Examinations, Government of Kerala
Department of Public Instruction, Government of Karnataka
Department of School Education, Government of Tamil Nadu
Directorate of Government Examinations, Government of Tamil Nadu

Education in Kerala
Education in Tamil Nadu
Education in Karnataka
School qualifications of India
Educational institutions in India with year of establishment missing